Rob Tenyer  is an American football coach.  He is the head coach of the Morehead State Eagles football team. He was named the head coach in December 2012 and coached his first game for the 2013 season.

Head coaching record

References

External links
 Morehead State profile

Year of birth missing (living people)
Living people
American football quarterbacks
California Vulcans football coaches
Centre Colonels football coaches
Morehead State Eagles football coaches
Olivet Comets football players